Por Amarte Así may refer to:

"Por Amarte Así" (song), 1999 song by Cristian Castro
Por amarte así (telenovela), 2016